Leonard William Hatton Jr. (August 17, 1956 – September 11, 2001) was an American special agent of the Federal Bureau of Investigation (FBI). He was killed in the September 11 attacks on the World Trade Center in New York City when he entered one of the towers to help evacuate the occupants and stayed when the towers collapsed.

Early life and personal life
Leonard W. Hatton Jr. was born in Teaneck, New Jersey and lived in Ridgefield Park, New Jersey, to Marilyn Hatton and Leonard Hatton Sr. who was a Ridgefield Park police officer. He graduated with the class of 1975 at Ridgefield Park High School, where was a halfback on the school's football team. He then attended Jersey City State College as an ROTC student, receiving his bachelor's in criminal justice. Shortly after, while in the United States Marine Corps he completed studies in forensic science at National University in San Diego. In 1978 he married his high school sweetheart, with whom he had four children.

Career
After six years of active duty, including a stint as a military police officer,  Hatton joined the FBI in New Orleans in 1985, and worked briefly in a small Louisiana office. In 1991, he was assigned to New York City as a member of an investigative team working on a bank robbery case. Leonard Hatton's main job was an FBI specialist in explosives and evidence recovery, where he worked until his death. In addition to cracking a number of high-profile bank robbery and kidnapping cases, he investigated international terrorist attacks such as the 1993 World Trade Center bombing, the 1998 United States embassy bombings, and the 2000 USS Cole bombing. Three months before the September 11 attacks, he had testified in the trial of a follower of the Islamic terrorist group al-Qaeda.

September 11 attacks

On the morning of September 11, 2001, Hatton was on his way to work when he saw the North Tower of the World Trade Center on fire after being struck by a jet airliner at 8:46 a.m. According to eyewitness accounts, he turned back to help. On his own initiative, he responded directly to the North Tower, where he assumed a position on the roof of the Marriott World Trade Center. From his vantage point, he radioed his squad from atop the hotel and reported that civilians were jumping from the North Tower. Because of falling debris, he moved from the roof and joined with New York City Fire Department (FDNY) firefighters in evacuating the civilians trapped within the South Tower. One civilian survivor told investigators that Hatton guided him to safety and then went back into the South Tower. Asking where Hatton was going, his last response was "back into the building". Hatton continued to stay in the South Tower to help evacuate the civilians in the building when it collapsed at 9:59 a.m., killing him, along with many others inside the South Tower.

Legacy
At the National 9/11 Memorial, Hatton is memorialized at the South Pool, on Panel S-26. In 2002, the Leonard W. Hatton Memorial Golf Classic was established in Colts Neck Township, New Jersey in dedication to his memory and has held an annual golf memorial since. All proceeds are donated to the Burchette, Conners, Ellington, Hereford, Lynch Memorial College Scholarship Fund. The Fund, a 501(c)(3) organization, provides college scholarships to the children of deceased FBI Special Agents. As of September 8, 2020, the Hatton Memorial Golf Classic has raised more than $3,564,400 for the Fund.

References 

1956 births
Federal Bureau of Investigation agents
United States Marines
2001 deaths
Emergency workers killed in the September 11 attacks
Terrorism deaths in New York (state)
American terrorism victims
People from Ridgefield Park, New Jersey
People murdered in New York City
Male murder victims
Ridgefield Park High School alumni